FTD may refer to:

People
 Frederick Thomas Dalton (1855–1927), British caricaturist

Places
 Fak Tha District, Uttaradit Province, Thailand
 Fatehabad Chandrawatiganj Junction railway station, in Madhya Pradesh, India

Music
 Follow That Dream Records, a Sony label for re-issuing Elvis Presley recordings
 Follow That Dream (band), a Dutch pop band

Instruments
 Fender Telecaster Deluxe, an electric guitar
 Fender Tweed Deluxe, a guitar amplifier

Songs
 "Festival Te Deum", an 1872 composition by Arthur Sullivan
 "From This Day", a 1999 single by American heavy metal band Machine Head
 Foolish Thing Desire, a 1992 song off the eponymous Daniel Ash album Foolish Thing Desire
 Fixin' to Die, 2011 cover of 1940 song Fixin' To Die Blues, off the eponymous album by G. Love, Fixin' To Die

Albums
 Fixin' To Die, 2011 album by G. Love
 Foolish Thing Desire, 1992 album by Daniel Ash
 From The Depths, 2012 album from British progressive death metal band Karybdis

Medicine
 Formal thought disorder
 Frontotemporal dementia

Sports
 FC Tytan Donetsk, a Ukrainian football team
 FK Tekstilac Derventa, a Bosnian football club

Technology
 Field test display
 Flight training device

Other uses 
 Failure to deliver
 Federal Territory Day in Malaysia
 Financial Times Deutschland,  a German financial newspaper
 Florists' Transworld Delivery, a floral wire service, retailer and wholesaler
 Foreign Technology Division, a former division of the United States Air Force

See also